The 1975 Montana State Bobcats football team was an American football team that represented Montana State University in the Big Sky Conference during the 1975 NCAA Division II football season. In their fifth season under head coach Sonny Holland, the Bobcats compiled a 5–5 record (4–2 against Big Sky opponents) and tied for second place in the Big Sky.

Tailback Steve Kracher became the second player in school history to rush for 1,000 yards in consecutive seasons.

Schedule

Roster

References

Montana State
Montana State Bobcats football seasons
Montana State Bobcats football